Castle Meadow Campus is a distinctive and large series of buildings in the west of the centre of Nottingham, currently occupied by HMRC (HM Revenue and Customs). The site was purchased by the University of Nottingham in November 2021

History
It is built on a former railway goods yard.

Design
The engineering was designed by Arup Group. The design employs natural ventilation. The main Amenity Building has a fabric roof suspended from four raking steel masts

The design employs the thermal mass of the concrete to cool the building at night. There are 1,052 pre-built deep brick piers with 863 concrete ceiling beams.

Construction
It was completed in September 1994.

Structure
It is situated off the A453 off Castle Meadow Road, next to the Nottingham Canal; a mile away down the A453 is Experian, and next to the train station is  Capital One. It comprises seven buildings with tree-lined boulevards.

Function
It houses around 1,800 staff.

See also
 Renault Centre

References

External links
 Design
 Nottingham Buildings
 University of Nottingham Castle Meadow Campus

1994 establishments in England
Buildings and structures in Nottingham
Government buildings completed in 1994
Government buildings in England
HM Revenue and Customs
Office buildings completed in 1994
Ove Arup buildings and structures